Deepak Lather (born 25 March 2000), is an Indian weightlifter who won the bronze medal in the men's 69 kg weight class at the 2018 Commonwealth Games in Gold Coast, Australia.
He is pursuing Business, India. He is the youngest person to hold an Indian national record in weightlifting. He is a Naib Subedar in Bombay Sappers in the Indian Army.

Personal life 
His father Bijender Lather was a farmer by profession. Deepak used to work with his father's farmland since childhood. That grooms his strength and made him a natural weightlifter. At the age of 16, in National Championship, he broke the national record in Men's 62 kg category. He joined Indian Army through Sports Quota and was initially trained for diving. But after being trained for few months, he was re-trained for weightlifting.

References

External links

Living people
2000 births
Indian male weightlifters
Weightlifters from Haryana
Commonwealth Games medallists in weightlifting
Commonwealth Games bronze medallists for India
Weightlifters at the 2018 Commonwealth Games
21st-century Indian people
Medallists at the 2018 Commonwealth Games